"Hunter & Prey" is a single by Danish singer-songwriter Emmelie de Forest. The song was released as the second single from her debut studio album Only Teardrops on 19 August 2013. The song was written by Emmelie de Forest, Lise Cabble and Jakob Schack Glæsner.

Music video
A music video to accompany the release of "Hunter & Prey" was first released onto YouTube on 16 September 2013 at a total length of three minutes and twenty-eight seconds.

Track listing

Release history

References

2013 singles
English-language Danish songs
Songs written by Emmelie de Forest
Songs written by Lise Cabble